Diple (meaning double, referring to the two lines in the mark >) was a mark used in the margins of ancient Greek manuscripts to draw attention to something in the text. It is sometimes also called antilambda because the sign resembles a Greek capital letter lambda (Λ) turned upon its side. In some ways its usage was similar to modern day quotation marks; guillemets (« »), used for quotations in French, are derived from it.

Isidore remarks in his Etymologiae (I.21.13) that the diple was used to mark quotations from the Bible. He also talks about diple peri strichon (or sticon), which was used to draw attention to separate concepts and diple periestigmene used (like obelos) to mark dubious passages. Diple obolismene was used according to Isidore to separate sentences in comedies and tragedies, so its usage was similar to that of paragraphos.

See also 
 Usenet quoting
 Obelos
 Coronis

References

External links 
 Punctuation

Palaeography
Punctuation
Ancient Greek punctuation